is a song by Japanese pop rock band U-ka Saegusa in dB. It was released on 29 October 2003 through Giza Studio, as the fourth single from their debut studio album U-ka saegusa IN db 1st ~Kimi to Yakusoku Shita Yasashii Ano Basho made~. The single reached number eight in Japan and has sold over 33,955 copies nationwide, becoming the band's best-selling single to date. The song served as the theme songs to the Japanese anime television series, Case Closed.

Track listing

Charts

Certification and sales

|-
! scope="row"| Japan (RIAJ)
| 
| 33,955
|-
|}

Release history

References

2003 singles
2003 songs
J-pop songs
Song recordings produced by Daiko Nagato